Subramaniam Krishnan (1942, Bedong, Malaysia – February 19, 2020, Kuala Lumpur, Malaysia), popularly known as K. S. Maniam,  was a Malaysian academic and novelist.

Biography
K. S. Maniam had been writing from his early teens. His stories have appeared in numerous journals around the world. His first novel, The Return, was published in 1981 and the second, In a Far Country, in 1993. He won the first prize for The Loved Flaw: Stories from Malaysia in The New Straits Times–McDonald short-story contest (1987) and for Haunting the Tiger: Contemporary Stories from Malaysia in The New Straits Times–Shell contest (1990). He was the inaugural recipient of the Raja Rao Award for Literature (New Delhi, September 2000), for his outstanding contribution to the literature of the South Asian diaspora. He was a lecturer (1980–85) and associate professor (1986–97) in the English Department, University of Malaya, in Kuala Lumpur. He lived with his wife, son and daughter in Subang Jaya, Malaysia, and devoted his time fully to writing.

He died on February 19, 2020, of cancer of the bile duct at the Universiti Malaya Medical Centre in Kuala Lumpur.

Bibliography

Novels
 The Return (London: Skoob, 1981, 1993)
 In A Far Country (1993)
 Between Lives (2003)

Plays
 The Cord (1983)
 The Sandpit: Womensis (1990)

Short stories
 The Eagles (1976)
 Removal in Pasir Panjang (1981)
 The Pelanduk (1981)
 The Third Child (1981)
 The Dream of Vasantha (1981)
 Project: Graft Man (1983)
 We Make It To The Capital (1984)
 The Aborting (1986)
 Encounters (1989)
 Parablames (1989)
 Plot (1989)
 Haunting the Tiger (1990)
 Sensuous Horizons: The Stories & The Plays (1994)
 In Flight (written 1993, published 1995)
 Arriving ...and other stories (1995)
 Faced Out (2004)
 Guardian Knot
 A Stranger to Love (2018)

External links
 K. S. Maniam 2 essays by the author.
 Malaysia as myth in K. S. Maniam's In a Far Country by Peter Wicks (pdf).
 "A Portrait of the Imagination as a Malleable Kolam: K. S. Maniam's In A Far Country" by Shanthini Pillai.
 "Renegotiating Identity and Belief in K.S. Maniam's The Return" by Tang Soo Ping.
 "Your memories are our memories": Remembering Culture as Race in Malaysia and K.S. Maniam's Between Lives" by David C.L. Lim.
 David C. L. Lim, "The Path of the Imagination: A Conversation with K. S. Maniam", Wasafiri, Issue 41.
 The Infinite Longing for Home. Desire and the Nation in Selected Writings of Ben Okri and K.S. Maniam by David C.L. Lim.
 "K.S Maniam and diasporic issues"
 Bernard Wilson, "An Interview with K.S. Maniam, World Literature Written in English" Vo 33.2 & 34.1, 1993-1994 
 Bernard Wilson, "Memory, Myth, Exile: The Desire for Malaysian Belonging in K.S. Maniam's The Return, "Haunting the Tiger' and ''In A Far Country'", Textual Practice Volume 17/2, Routledge, 2003.

References

 internationales literaturfestival berlin

1942 births
2020 deaths
Malaysian people of Indian descent
English-language writers from Malaysia
Malaysian writers
Malaysian Hindus
Deaths from cholangiocarcinoma
Deaths from cancer in Malaysia